Plaikner is a German surname. Notable people with the surname include:

Michael Plaikner, Italian luger of Austrian origin
Walter Plaikner (born 1951), Italian luger and coach of Austrian origin

German-language surnames